Edward Harold Davies (generally referred to as E. Harold Davies) (18 July 1867 - 1 July 1947) was professor of music at the University of Adelaide, Principal of the Elder Conservatorium, and brother of Sir Walford Davies.

Harold was the third of four sons of John Whitridge Davies of Oswestry on the English-Welsh border. He emigrated to Australia in 1886, returned to England in 1890 where he was appointed organist at the Chapel Royal, then returned to Australia where he founded the South Australia Orchestra (later to become the Adelaide Symphony Orchestra) and played a leading role in the teaching and examination of music.

Davies was in his time a choir leader, conductor, critic, promoter, teacher and organist.  He was also a radio commentator and a noted recorder of indigenous music.

In 1933, Davies edited "The Children's Bach", a collection of 20 simple Bach pieces for piano, selected mostly from the Clavier-Book for Anna Magdalena. Beloved by both music students and teachers, the collection is still in print.

References

External links
Online Guide to Records at the South Australian Museum Archives

Sources 
 Colles, H. C. Walford Davies, 1942
 biography at Australian Dictionary of Biography

English organists
British male organists
1867 births
1947 deaths